Nirmal Verma (3 April 192925 October 2005) was a Hindi writer, novelist, activist and translator. He is credited as being one of the pioneers of the Nai Kahani (New Story) literary movement of Hindi literature, wherein his first collection of stories, Parinde (Birds) is considered its first signature.

In his career spanning five decades and various forms of literature, writing story, travelogues and essays, he penned five novels, eight short-story collections and nine books of non-fiction, including essays and travelogues.

Biography 

Nirmal Verma was born on 3 April 1929 in Shimla, where his father worked as an officer in the Civil and Services Department of the British Indian Government. He was the seventh child among his eight siblings. One of his brothers is one of India's greatest artists Ram Kumar. He is survived by his wife, Gagan Gill who is a writer.

He wrote his first story for a students' magazine in the early 1950s. He completed  Masters of Arts in History from St. Stephen's College, Delhi University. Thereafter he started teaching in Delhi and writing for various literary magazines.

His activism streak was visible even during his student days; in 1947–48, he regularly attended Mahatma Gandhiji's morning prayer meetings in Delhi, even though he was a card holding member of Communist Party of India, which he resigned in 1956, after Soviet invasion of Hungary. The very activism was soon to be reflected in his stories, which added a whole new dimension to the Indian literary scene.

He stayed in Prague for 10 years, where he was invited by Oriental Institute to initiate a program of translation of modern Czech writers like Karel Capek, Milan Kundera, and Bohumil Hrabal, to Hindi; he also learnt the Czech language, and translated nine world classics to Hindi, before returning home in 1968, as the result of Prague Spring.

During his stay in Prague he travelled widely across Europe, and the result was seven travelogues, including Cheeron Par Chandni (1962), Har Barish Mein (1970) and Dhund Se Uthti Dhun and his first novel, based on his student days in Prague, titled, "Ve Din"  (Those Days) (1964). On his return from Prague, he was disillusioned by Communism and later became highly vocal against Indian Emergency, and an advocate for the Tibetan independence movement. His subsequent writing reflected his concerted relooking of Indian traditions, which he found to be innately modern, compared with external modernity reflected in the western viewpoints and cultural milieu, which were being imposed on Indian ethos, all around, so much so that later his views were confused as pro-Hindutva as well. A critical analysis of Verma's work was presented by Ram Prakash Dwivedi

From 1980–83, Verma served as chairman of Nirala creative writing chair in Bharat Bhavan, Bhopal. In 1988–90 he was director of Yashpal Creative Writing Chair in Shimla. A film based on his story, Maya Darpan (1972), directed by Kumar Shahani, won the Filmfare Critics Award for Best Film.

In his popular novel A Torn Happiness, August Strindberg looms large over the heads of many characters.

He died on 25 October 2005 in New Delhi.

Awards and milestones 

 Jnanpith Award in 1999, the highest literary award for Indian writers.
 'Kavve aur Kala Pani', A collection of seven short stories, won the Sahitya Akademi Award in 1985.
 Padma Bhushan in 2002.
 Jnanapith Trust's "Murtidevi Award" for his book of essays, Bharat Aur Europe: Pratishruti Ke Kshetra (1991).
 Jury member Lettre Ulysses Award for the art of Reportage −2003.
 He was a fellow with the International Institute for Asian Studies.
 Library of Congress catalogues most of the works of Nirmal Verma in its collection.
  India's highest literary award, for lifetime achievement, the Sahitya Akademi Fellowship in 2005.
 On the publication of his book, "The World Elsewhere", in 1988, by the Readers International in London, BBC Channel Four telecasted a film on his life and works.
  Chevalier de l'ordre des arts et des lettres (France) 2005

Nai Kahani movement 

Nirmal Verma, together with Mohan Rakesh, Bhisham Sahni, Kamleshwar, Amarkant, Rajendra Yadav and others, is the founder of the Nai Kahani (new short story) in Hindi literature.

Nirmal Verma is best known for his short stories and his best known story, 'Parinde'  (Birds) (1959) is supposed to be the pioneer of the Nai Kahani Movement in Hindi literature. Nirmal Verma's other notable stories are Andhere Mein, Dedh Inch Upar, and Kavve Aur Kala Pani.
Nirmal Verma's last story was published in "Naya Gyanodaya" August 2005 issue, titled "Ab Kuchh Nahin".

Nirmal Verma experimented vividly with theme as well as technique of the Hindi short story in the 60s and 70s.

A collection of his letters written to Ramkumar (well known artist and his brother) has been published by Bhartiya Jnanpith, titled "Priya Ram" (Dear Ram).  His books have been translated into several European languages such as English, Russian, German, Icelandic, Polish, Italian and French.

Major works

Novels
Ve Din – His first novel, set in Prague, former Czechoslovakia (1964),
Antima Aranya (The Last Wilderness)
Ek Chithara Sukh (1979)
Lal Teen Ki Chhat (Red Tin Roof), (1974)
Raat ka Reporter  (1989)

Story anthologies
 'Parinde' (Birds) (1959)
 Jalti Jhari (1965)
 London ki raat
Pichli Garmiyon Mein (1968)
 Akala tripathi
 Dedh Inch Upar
  Beech Bahas Mein (1973)
  Meri Priya Kahaniyan (1973)
  Pratinidhi Kahaniyan (1988)
  Kavve aur Kala Pani (1983)
 Sookha aur Anya Kahaniyan (1995).
 Dhage (2003)

Reportage and travelogues
 Cheeron Par Chandni (1962)
 Har Barish Mein (1989)(In Every Rain)

Plays
 Teen Ekant (1976)

Essays and literary criticism
 Shabda aur Smriti (1976) – Literary essay
Kala Ka Jokhima (1981) – investigation of the Indic arts in the 20th century
Dhundha Se Uthati Dhun – written like a diary on issues related to Hindi literature. – Literary criticism
 Dhalan se Utarate Huye – Literary criticism
 Bharat Aur Europe: Pratishruti Ke Kshetra (1991) – Essay.

Further reading 
 Encyclopaedia of Indian Literature, 1992, Sahitya Akademi, Page 4503-4.
  The lost stream by Nirmal Verma (short story)
 A Day's Guest by Nirmal Verma (short story)
 Dhage (धागे) by Nirmal Verma
  "The Truth of Maya"[Maya ka Marm]by Nirmal Verma (short story)

See also
 List of Indian writers

References

External links 
Nirmal Verma at Abhivyakti
 An Interview with Nirmal Verma, 2002
 Nirmal Verma at Library of Congress

1929 births
2005 deaths
Recipients of the Sahitya Akademi Award in Hindi
Recipients of the Sahitya Akademi Fellowship
Recipients of the Jnanpith Award
Recipients of the Padma Bhushan in literature & education
Chevaliers of the Ordre des Arts et des Lettres
Indian male novelists
Indian literary critics
20th-century Indian translators
Hindi-language writers
Hindi-language poets
People from Shimla
St. Stephen's College, Delhi alumni
Delhi University alumni
20th-century Indian poets
20th-century Indian novelists
Indian male poets
Indian male essayists
International Writing Program alumni
20th-century Indian essayists
Novelists from Himachal Pradesh
Poets from Himachal Pradesh
20th-century Indian male writers
Recipients of the Moortidevi Award